The swimming competition during the 2005 Summer Universiade, also known as the XXIV Summer Universiade, took place in the Manisa Özel Ýdare Swimming Complex in İzmir, Turkey from August 12 until August 17, 2005. The swimming competition is one of the fourteen sports of the 23rd Universiade 2005.


Men's events

Women's events

Medal table

External links
 Official Results

Swimming at the Summer Universiade
Universiade
Swimming